Gordonia soli is a bacterium from the genus of Gordonia which has been isolated from soil in Taiwan.

References

Further reading

External links
Type strain of Gordonia soli at BacDive -  the Bacterial Diversity Metadatabase	

Mycobacteriales
Bacteria described in 2006